Clinidium extrarium is a species of ground beetle in the subfamily Rhysodinae. It was described by R.T. & J.R. Bell in 1978. The type series originates from "N. Amerika"; the specific locality is unknown but likely was in the tropical lowlands of Mexico or northern Central America.

Clinidium extrarium measure  in length.

References

Clinidium
Beetles of North America
Beetles described in 1978